Michaël Llodra and Fabrice Santoro defeated Leander Paes and Nenad Zimonjić in the final, 6–7(6–8), 6–3, 7–6(7–4) to win the doubles tennis title at the 2005 Tennis Masters Cup.

Bob Bryan and Mike Bryan were the two-time defending champions, but were defeated in the semifinals by Llodra and Santoro.

Seeds

Draw

Finals

Red group
Standings are determined by: 1. number of wins; 2. number of matches; 3. in two-players-ties, head-to-head records; 4. in three-players-ties, percentage of sets won, or of games won; 5. steering-committee decision.

Gold group
Standings are determined by: 1. number of wins; 2. number of matches; 3. in two-players-ties, head-to-head records; 4. in three-players-ties, percentage of sets won, or of games won; 5. steering-committee decision.

External links
Finals Draw
Round robin Draw (Red Group)
Round robin Draw (Gold Group)

Doubles